Persicaria capitata, the pink-headed persicaria, pinkhead smartweed, pink knotweed, Japanese knotweed, or pink bubble persicaria, is  an Asian species of plants in the genus Persicaria within the buckwheat family. It is native to Asia (China, Indian Subcontinent, Indochina) and grown as an ornamental in other countries. It has become naturalized in Australia, South Africa and a few scattered locations in the United States.

Description
Persicaria capitata is a prostrate herb. The leaves are 1–6 cm long, 0.7–3 cm wide with pink to red bands or blotches and short scattered hairs. The spikes are 5–10 mm long and 5–7 mm in diameter.

Persicaria capitata has a strong urine-scented odour.

Distribution and habitat
Persicaria capitata is a native of Asia. It has naturalised in parts of Australia and North America. Between 2008 and 2013 it has been recorded as an invasive plant in Ireland from the Counties Fermanagh, Kilkenny, Wexford and Mayo.

Uses
Persicaria capitata has been widely used in China in the treatment of various urologic disorders including urinary calculi and urinary tract infections.

See also
 Reynoutria japonica for another plant species called Japanese knotweed.

References

External links

Jepson Manual Treatment, University of California

capitata
Flora of Asia
Plants described in 1825